Pasquale Aleardi (born 1 June 1971) is a Swiss actor. He is known for playing the role of 'J.D. Salinas' in Resident Evil. He also starred as Billy Flynn in the Broadway production of Chicago.

In 2016, Aleardi starred in the lead role of Tommaso, an Italian Miner in Gotthard (2016). The film is the largest-scale Swiss TV production ever made and screened as a world premiere on 2 August 2016 for the traditional Prefestival evening, at the Festival del film Locarno 2016. 

Aleardi is the son of Greco-Italian emigrants.  Aleardi was hired for his first Swiss film role in Tschäss. Despite the sudden success he ended 1995, the Theatre Academy and went to Germany, where he took engagements at theaters in Bonn, Düsseldorf and Cologne.

After several theater successes on German stages with pieces such as The Big Bang by Arthur Miller (Best Production NRW 96 / Berlin Theatre Meeting), his interest focused on the movie. He played among others on the side of Veronica Ferres in the TV movie Forever Lost, for its German cinema debut  to cast him alongside Heike Makatsch and Heino Ferch, with the main role in a film version of Bertolt Brecht's Baal he mimed the role of Ekart alongside Matthias Schweighofer and his performance on the side of Milla Jovovich in the 80 million expensive production Resident Evil gave him first on the international stage.

One of the greatest successes landed Pasquale to his home country, when copilot Peter Landolt Pasquale Aleardi celebrated in January 2006 hit movie in the Swiss cinema production Grounding - The Last Days of Swissair.

In Germany, Aleardi played in 2006 in the spring at the Berlinale in the film Beautiful Life, as well as in the theater adaptation of Frank Wedekind Lulu. In Anke Engelke series womanizing he put his comedy talent. In autumn 2006 launched the German film comedy Where Is Fred? in which Aleardi was an egocentric Marketing Manager, Alexandra Maria Lara, Jürgen Vogel and Til Schweiger makes life difficult. Simultaneously launched in Switzerland, the television production sweets, in which he tries to save as a charming Blender his company with all the tricks from ruin.

Pasquale Aleardi lives in Berlin, speaks five languages; next to the spectacle is music his second passion. He is active as a singer, plays the piano and is a member of the Cologne music project since 2004.

In 2017 he won a Swiss Film Award for Best Leading Actor for playing the role of Tommaso in Gotthard in (2016).

Selected filmography

Awards and nominations

References

External links

1971 births
Living people
Male actors from Zürich
Swiss male film actors
Swiss male television actors
20th-century Swiss male actors
21st-century Swiss male actors